Atelopus nepiozomus is a species of toad in the family Bufonidae.
It is endemic to Ecuador.
Its natural habitats are subtropical or tropical high-altitude grassland and rivers.
It is threatened by habitat loss.

References

nepiozomus
Amphibians of Ecuador
Amphibians of the Andes
Amphibians described in 1973
Taxonomy articles created by Polbot